Flampouro is a village and a community of the Elassona municipality. Before the 2011 local government reform it was a part of the municipality of Olympos. The 2011 census recorded 177 inhabitants in the village and 273 inhabitants in the community. The community of Flampouro covers an area of 58.72 km2.

Administrative division
The community of Kallithea Elassonos consists of two settlements:
Flampouro (population 177)
 Iera Moni Sparmou (Greek for Holy Monastery of Sparmos) (population 1)
Skopia (population 95)
The aforementioned population figures are as of 2011.

Population
According to the 2011 census, the population of the settlement of Flampouro was 177 people, a decrease of almost 10% compared with the population of the previous census of 2001.

See also
 List of settlements in the Larissa regional unit

References

Populated places in Larissa (regional unit)